North West Lanarkshire was a county constituency of the House of Commons of the Parliament of the United Kingdom (Westminster) from 1885 to 1918. It elected one Member of Parliament (MP) by the first past the post voting system.

Boundaries 

The name relates the constituency to the county of Lanark. The Redistribution of Seats Act 1885 provided that the North-West division was to consist of "so much of the Parish of Barony as lies beyond the present boundary of the municipal burgh of Glasgow and to the east of the main line of railway before mentioned (main line of railway between Glasgow and Edinburgh of the North British Railway Company (being the old Edinburgh and Glasgow Railway), and the parishes of Cadder and Old Monkland".

Members of Parliament

Elections

Elections in the 1880s

Elections in the 1890s 

Holburn's death caused a by-election.

Elections in the 1900s

Elections in the 1910s 

General Election 1914–15:

Another General Election was required to take place before the end of 1915. The political parties had been making preparations for an election to take place and by the July 1914, the following candidates had been selected; 
Liberal: William Pringle
Unionist:

References 

Lanarkshire
Historic parliamentary constituencies in Scotland (Westminster)
Constituencies of the Parliament of the United Kingdom established in 1885
Constituencies of the Parliament of the United Kingdom disestablished in 1918